Walter James Knox  (6 March 1919 – 1 December 1991) was a leading New Zealand trade union leader. He was the seventh appointee to the Order of New Zealand

Early life and family
Knox was born in Auckland on 6 March 1919. His parents were Doris May and Walter William Knox. Knox was educated at Auckland Normal School.

Career and honours
Leaving school aged 15, Knox first worked in a foundry where he was badly scarred. Aged 16, he started an apprenticeship in the footwear trade upon his father's initiative. Knox worked as a truck driver and watersider, becoming involved in the 1951 waterside strike, and rose through the union ranks to become secretary of the Auckland District Woollen Mills Employees’ Union and vice president of the Auckland Trades Council in 1961. In 1969, Knox became secretary of the New Zealand Federation of Labour, working alongside the organisation's president, Sir Tom Skinner.

Skinner, Knox and other trade union leaders Ken Douglas, Bill Andersen, Pat Kelly, Blue Kennedy and Con Devitt were all well known in New Zealand 1980s due to ongoing industrial action. 

On 6 February 1988, Knox was the seventh appointee to the Order of New Zealand.

Personal life
Knox played rugby union for the Suburbs club in Auckland before switching codes and playing rugby league for the City Rovers in the Auckland Rugby League competition. His sports injuries made him unfit for war service during World War II.

Knox was married twice, first to Margaret Joyce Svendsen in 1943, they had two children and a long marriage, then to Elizabeth Watson Bell Curtis (née Norrie) in 1983.

References

1919 births
1991 deaths
New Zealand trade unionists
People from Auckland
New Zealand rugby league players
City Rovers players
New Zealand rugby union players
Members of the Order of New Zealand
New Zealand justices of the peace